The Ming Shilu contains the imperial annals of the emperors of the Ming dynasty (1368–1644). It is the single largest historical source for the dynasty. According to modern historians, it  "plays an extremely important role in the historical reconstruction of Ming society and politics." After the fall of the Ming dynasty, the  Ming Shilu was used as a primary source for the compilation of the History of Ming by the Qing dynasty.

Historical sources 
The Veritable Records (shilu) for each emperor was composed after the emperor's death by a History Office appointed by the Grand Secretariat using different types of historical sources such as:
 "The Qiju zhu, or 'Diaries of Activity and Repose'. These were daily records of the actions and words of the Emperor in court."
 "The 'Daily Records'. These records, established precisely as a source for the compilation of the shilu, were compiled by a committee on the basis of the diaries and other written sources."
 Other sources such as materials collected from provincial centres and "culled from other official sources such as memorials, ministerial papers and the Metropolitan Gazette."

List of books

References

Citations

Sources 
 Works cited

 
  provides detailed and extensive background information on how the Ming Shi-lu was composed and the rhetoric that it uses.

Further reading 
 Wade, Geoff. tr. (2005). Southeast Asia in the Ming Shi-lu: an open access resource. Singapore: Asia Research Institute and the Singapore E-Press, National University of Singapore.

External links 
 
 
 Interactive scholarly edition, with critical English translation and multimodal resources mashup (publications, images, videos) Engineering Historical Memory.

Chinese history texts
Ming dynasty literature
Tai history
History of Laos
History of Myanmar
History of Malaysia
History of Vietnam
History books about the Ming dynasty